Muhammad Fakhrudin (born April 14, 1982) is an Indonesian professional footballer who plays as an attacking midfielder or winger. Previously he played for Sriwijaya.

Honours

Persisam Putra Samarinda
Premier Division: 2008–09

Arema Indonesia
Indonesia Super League: 2009–10

Sriwijaya
Indonesian Inter Island Cup: 2012

References

External links 
 Fakhrudin on deltras-fc.com

Indonesian footballers
Living people
1982 births
Association football midfielders
Persijap Jepara players
Sriwijaya F.C. players
Arema F.C. players
Deltras F.C. players
Persik Kediri players
People from Sidoarjo Regency
Sportspeople from East Java